Big Sandy Pond is a  natural kettlehole pond in Plymouth, Massachusetts. It is a semi-private pond located within West Wind Shores, north of Buzzards Bay, Little Sandy Pond and Whites Pond, and east of Ezekiel Pond. There are less than two miles (3 km) of shoreline. Bourne Road runs near the western shore of the pond. The Ponds of Plymouth, a large residential development, surrounds the northern and eastern shores of the pond. The Division of Fisheries & Wildlife provides access in the form of a concrete pad ramp suitable for trailer boats off Gunning Point Road, a dirt road, at the southeastern shore.

External links
Mass Div. of Fisheries and Wildlife - Pond map and info
Environmental Protection Agency

Ponds of Plymouth, Massachusetts
Ponds of Massachusetts